Cristozoa (also known as crest animals) is a grouping of animals possessing a neural crest and derivatives.

It includes all the Craniata, as well as their immediate precraniate precursors. The precraniate crest animals, such Haikouella and Yunnanozoon, are all extinct and found only in Early Cambrian strata of Yunnan (southwestern China).

References

 
Deuterostome unranked clades